Warren is a city in Warren County, Pennsylvania, United States, located along the Allegheny River. The population was 9,404 at the 2020 census. It is the county seat of Warren County. It is home to the headquarters of the Allegheny National Forest and the Cornplanter State Forest. It is also the headquarters for the Chief Cornplanter Council, the oldest continuously chartered Boy Scouts of America Council, and the catalog company Blair.  Warren is the principal city of the Warren, PA Micropolitan Statistical Area.

History
Warren was initially inhabited by Native Americans of the Seneca nation. French explorers had longstanding claims to the area which they acted to secure in an unambiguous fashion with a military-Amerindian expedition in 1749 that buried a succession of plaques claiming the territory as France's in response to the formation of the colonial Ohio Companyand the first of these was buried in Warren but ultimately control was transferred to the British after the French and Indian War. After the Revolutionary War, General William Irvine and Andrew Ellicott were sent to the area to lay out a town in 1795. It was named after Major General Joseph Warren.

The first permanent structure in Warren, a storehouse built by the Holland Land Company, was completed in 1796. Daniel McQuay of Ireland was the first permanent inhabitant of European descent. Lumber was the main industry from 1810–1840, as the abundance of wood and access to water made it profitable to float lumber down the Allegheny River to Pittsburgh.

David Beaty discovered oil in Warren in 1875 while drilling for natural gas in his wife's flower garden. Oil came to dominate the city's economy. Many of the town's large Victorian homes were built with revenue generated by the local oil and timber industries.

Pittsburgh Des Moines, which was formerly located in Warren, was the manufacturer of the Gateway Arch in St. Louis. Pittsburgh-Des Moines (PDM) also made railroad car tanks, storage tanks and other plate work. Several miniature replicas are located within the county as well, one being at the new visitors center on Routes US 6 and US 62 next to the Pennsylvania State Police barracks.

In recent years, Warren has struggled through hard economic times and a steady decline in population (after peaking at nearly 15,000 residents in 1940), but the city is attempting to bounce back with the Impact Warren project, a riverfront development project in downtown Warren. The completed project will include new townhouses and senior citizen housing, retail and commercial development, a parking garage, convention center and bus depot.

Major employers include Walmart, the United Refining Company (gas supplier for Kwik Fill and Red Apple Food Mart gas stations), Allegheny National Forest, Northwest Bank, Whirley-Drinkworks, Superior Tire and Rubber Corp, Pennsylvania General Energy, Betts Industries, Inc, Blair Corporation, Sheetz, and Interlectric.

The Warren Historic District, A.J. Hazeltine House, John P. Jefferson House, Struthers Library Building, Warren Armory, Warren County Courthouse, Wetmore House, Guy Irvine House ("The Locusts") and Woman's Club of Warren are listed on the National Register of Historic Places.

Geography
Warren is located at the confluence of the Allegheny River and the Conewango Creek. The Conewango Creek flows between New York State and Warren, and the Allegheny Reservoir and Kinzua Dam are nearby.

The Allegheny River from the Kinzua Dam to the City of Warren has been designated a "Recreational Waterway" by the United States Congress.

Climate

Demographics

As of the census of 2000, there were 10,259 people, 4,565 households, and 2,606 families residing in the city. The population density was 3,508.3 people per square mile (1,356.5/km2). There were 5,046 housing units at an average density of 1,725.6 per square mile (667.2/km2). The racial makeup of the city was 98.53% White, 0.20% African American, 0.20% Native American, 0.36% Asian, 0.02% Pacific Islander, 0.13% from other races, and 0.56% from two or more races. Hispanic or Latino of any race were 0.39% of the population.

There were 4,566 households, out of which 27.2% had children under the age of 18 living with them, 43.0% were married couples living together, 10.8% had a female householder with no husband present, and 42.9% were non-families. 37.6% of all households were made up of individuals, and 16.4% had someone living alone who was 65 years of age or older. The average household size was 2.17 and the average family size was 2.87.

In the city, the population was spread out, with 23.1% under the age of 18, 7.0% from 18 to 24, 28.4% from 25 to 44, 23.4% from 45 to 64, and 18.1% who were 65 years of age or older. The median age was 39 years. For every 100 females, there were 88.5 males. For every 100 females age 18 and over, there were 83.9 males.

The median income for a household in the city was $32,384, and the median income for a family was $41,986. Males had a median income of $32,049 versus $22,969 for females. The per capita income for the city was $18,272. About 8.0% of families and 10.7% of the population were below the poverty line, including 11.5% of those under age 18 and 6.0% of those age 65 or over.

Education 
Northern Pennsylvania Regional College (or NPRC) is an open-admissions college established in 2017 and, as of May 28th, 2019, is authorized by the Pennsylvania Department of Education to grant degrees and certificates in the Commonwealth of Pennsylvania.

For public K-12 education, the Warren County School District provides four elementary schools (Eisenhower, Sheffield Area, Warren Area, and Youngsville), one middle school (Beaty-Warren), three middle-high schools (Eisenhower, Sheffield Area, and Youngsville), and one high school (Warren Area). 

The Warren County Career Center is an area vocational-technical school serving only the students in the Warren County School District. The Career Center provides training in multiple vocational fields to students in grades 10 through 12.

Sports
Warren hosted minor league baseball in three different leagues. The 1895 "Warren" team first played minor league baseball as members of the Iron and Oil League. Between 1908 and 1916, Warren hosted the Warren Blues (1908), Warren Bingoes (1914–1915) and Warren Warriors (1916) teams, who all played as members of the Class D level Interstate League. In 1940 and 1941, the Warren Redskins and Warren Buckeyes played in the Class D level Pennsylvania State Association. The team was a minor league affiliate of the Cleveland Indians in 1940. The Warren teams played home minor league games at Russell Park.

Notable people
 Earl Hanley Beshlin was a Democratic member of the U.S. House of Representatives from Pennsylvania.
 William Clinger, Jr., U.S. Representative
 Gudrun Ensslin, founder member of German activist group the Red Army Faction, attended high school in Warren
 Alice Isabel Hazeltine, librarian, editor, and writer
 George Lilja, NFL player & All American
 Ed O'Neil, NFL player & All American
 Tom Tellmann, baseball player
 Art Johnson, baseball player
 Joe Brown, baseball player

See also
 Oil Creek Railroad

References

External links

 City of Warren, Pennsylvania

 
Cities in Warren County, Pennsylvania
County seats in Pennsylvania
Populated places established in 1795
Cities in Pennsylvania
1795 establishments in Pennsylvania